Karawata multiflora is a species of flowering plant in the family Bromeliaceae, endemic to northeastern Brazil. It was first described by Lyman Bradford Smith in 1937 as Aechmea multiflora.

References

Bromelioideae
Endemic flora of Brazil
Plants described in 1937